Thecofilosea is a class of Cercozoa.

References

 
Cercozoa classes